Abzaria is a genus of ichneumon wasps in the family Ichneumonidae. There are at least two described species in Abzaria.

Species
These two species belong to the genus Abzaria:
 Abzaria latipetiolaris Cameron, 1885
 Abzaria petiolaris

References

Ichneumoninae